The Robeline Methodist Church is a historic Methodist church on Texas Street (Louisiana Highway 6) in Robeline, Louisiana.

It was built in 1883 in Gothic Revival style and was added to the National Register of Historic Places in 1988.

It was deemed locally significant as the only example of a Gothic Revival church in Natchitoches Parish.

References

Methodist churches in Louisiana
Churches on the National Register of Historic Places in Louisiana
Carpenter Gothic church buildings in Louisiana
Churches completed in 1883
Churches in Natchitoches Parish, Louisiana
National Register of Historic Places in Natchitoches Parish, Louisiana